John Edward Wilson (August 8, 1861 – February 2, 1935) was a Canadian politician. He served in the Legislative Assembly of New Brunswick from 1908 to 1917 as an independent member.

References 

1861 births
1933 deaths